Lanio is the genus of shrike-tanagers in the family Thraupidae.

The genus was introduced by the French ornithologist Louis Jean Pierre Vieillot in 1816 with the fulvous shrike-tanager (Lanio fulvus) as the type species. The genus name is derived from the shrike genus Lanius that was introduced by the Swedish naturalist Carl Linnaeus in 1758 in the tenth edition of his Systema Naturae.

Species list
The genus contains four species:

References

 
Bird genera